Elisabeth Prass is a Canadian politician, who was elected to the National Assembly of Quebec in the 2022 Quebec general election. She represents the riding of D'Arcy-McGee as a member of the Quebec Liberal Party.

Prior to her election to the legislature, Prass was director of the constituency office of her predecessor, David Birnbaum.

References

21st-century Canadian politicians
21st-century Canadian women politicians
Quebec Liberal Party MNAs
Women MNAs in Quebec
People from Côte Saint-Luc
Living people
Year of birth missing (living people)